Manley railway station was located to the west of Manley, Cheshire, England. The station was opened by the Cheshire Lines Committee on 22 June 1870, closed to passengers on 1 May 1875 and closed completely on 6 March 1961.

References 

Disused railway stations in Cheshire
Railway stations in Great Britain opened in 1870
Railway stations in Great Britain closed in 1961
Former Cheshire Lines Committee stations